Crocus cartwrightianus is a species of flowering plant in the family Iridaceae, native to mainland Greece and Crete. The flowers, in shades of lilac or white with purple veins and prominent red stigmas, appear with the leaves in autumn and winter.

Description
The  flower style divides while still within the throat of the flower, well below the bases of the anthers. The branches of the stigma are taller than the anthers and about the same length as the petals. The throat of the flower is bearded. The leaves and flowers are produced at the same. 

The Latin specific epithet cartwrightianus refers to the 19th century British Consul to Constantinople, John Cartwright.

C. cartwrightianus is the presumed wild progenitor of the domesticated triploid Crocus sativus – the saffron crocus. 
Although some doubts remain on its origin, it is believed that saffron originated in Iran. However, Greece and Mesopotamia have also been suggested as the possible region of origin of this plant.

Habitat
This species is commonly found growing on limestone soil areas of the Attica Peninsula of Greece.

Cultivation
There is evidence that this plant was cultivated in ancient Crete at least as early as the Middle Minoan Period, as exhibited by a mural, the "Saffron Gatherer", illustrating the gathering of crocuses.

This plant, has gained the Royal Horticultural Society's Award of Garden Merit.

References

External links

cartwrightianus
Flora of Greece
Plants described in 1843